Dionigi Valesi (c.1730 – c.1780) was an Italian printmaker active in Verona and Venice.

Valesi was born in Parma.  His work included reproductions of paintings by Paolo Veronese, Francesco Guardi, Francesco Battaglioli and Pietro Antonio Rotari and by the architect Adriano Cristofali, as well as book illustrations and portraits of Venetian noblemen.  He died in Venice.

Works
After Guardi, The Grand Canal at Riva di Biasio, The Island of S Giorgio Maggiore and an architectural capriccio (c.1778)
Map of the City of Verona Showing the Flood of 2 December 1752

Sources
Art Encyclopedia. The Concise Grove Dictionary of Art., 2002

1730 births
1780 deaths
Italian printmakers
Artists from Parma